The women's 10 metre platform was one of eight diving events included in the Diving at the 2000 Summer Olympics programme.

The competition was split into three phases:

Preliminary round 22 September — Each diver performed five dives out of a group consisting of a front dive, a back dive, a reverse dive, an inward dive, a twisting dive and an armstand dive. There were no limitations in degree of difficulty. The 18 divers with the highest total score advanced to the semi-final.
Semi-final 24 September — Each diver performed four dives out of a group consisting of a front dive, a back dive, a reverse dive, an inward dive, a twisting dive and an armstand dive, all limited in difficulty degree. The 12 divers with the highest combined score from the semi-final and preliminary dives advanced to the final.
Final 24 September — Each diver performed five dives out of a group consisting of a front dive, a back dive, a reverse dive, an inward dive, a twisting dive and an armstand dive. The final ranking was determined by the combined score from the final and semi-final dives.

Results

References

Sources
 

Women
2000
2000 in women's diving
Women's events at the 2000 Summer Olympics